Hispanoclavinae is an extinct subfamily of ground and water beetles in the family Coptoclavidae.

References

External links

Coptoclavidae